Camí de la Retirada (Spanish: Camino de la Retirada) ("Path of the Retreat") refers to routes and paths in the eastern Pyrenees used by Republican exiles at the end of the Spanish Civil War. It is estimated that about 100,000 people of all ages used this path in January and February, 1939.

History 

The fall of Barcelona on 26 January 1939 caused a mass exodus of both civilians and soldiers who fled to the French border. This withdrawal – known in Catalonia as the Retirada – led to the displacement of close to 500,000 people, one of the largest refugee crises in Europe of all time. Mountain paths in Cerdanya and Ripollès were used as alternatives to increasingly impassable roads in Alt Empordà. All refugees entering France were disarmed and arrested.

See also 
 Camp de concentration d'Argelès-sur-Mer

References

Further reading 
 

Spanish Civil War
Pyrenees
Social history of Spain
France–Spain relations
Geography of Catalonia
European Cultural Routes
Hiking trails in Spain
Hiking trails in Europe
Heritage trails
Forced migration
Evacuations
1930s in Spain
Modern history of Spain